The 199th Pennsylvania House of Representatives District is located in Cumberland County and includes the following areas:

 Carlisle
 Dickinson Township
 Lower Frankford Township
 Lower Mifflin Township
 Middlesex Township
 Newville
 North Middleton Township
 Silver Spring Township (PART, Precincts 05, 06, 08 and 09)
 Upper Frankford Township
 Upper Mifflin Township
 West Pennsboro Township

Representatives

References

Government of Cumberland County, Pennsylvania
199